"Hood Go Crazy" is a song by American rapper Tech N9ne featuring fellow American rappers 2 Chainz and B.o.B, released  released on February 26, 2015 as the lead single from the former's fifteenth studio album Special Effects (2015). Produced by N4, the song was certified Platinum by the Recording Industry Association of America (RIAA) on June 17, 2020, for selling over one million units in the United States.

Music video
The music video debuted on MTV on April 26, 2015.

Commercial performance
The song is Tech N9ne's highest charting single as a lead artist, peaking at No. 90 on the Billboard Hot 100, becoming his only song to chart.

Charts

Weekly charts

Year-end charts

Certifications

References

2015 singles
2015 songs
Tech N9ne songs
2 Chainz songs
B.o.B songs
Songs written by 2 Chainz
Songs written by B.o.B